Ossówka  is a village in the administrative district of Gmina Leśna Podlaska, within Biała Podlaska County, Lublin Voivodeship, in eastern Poland.

The village has an approximate population of 500.

References

Villages in Biała Podlaska County